Sanguantang station may refer to:

 Sanguantang station (Ningbo Rail Transit), in Ningbo, Zhejiang Province, China
 Sanguantang station (Chengdu Metro), in Chengdu, Sichuan Province, China